King Jingmin of Wei (died 228 BC, ruled 242–228 BC), personal name Wei Wu was the penultimate king of Wei. He was son of King Anxi of Wei. He made an alliance with the states of Han, Zhao, Yan and Chu against the state of Qin. This alliance failed with Han's destruction by Qin in 230 BC.

Monarchs of Wei (state)
3rd-century BC Chinese monarchs
Chinese kings